The Djiboutian ambassador in Washington, D. C. is the official representative of the Government in Djibouti City to the Government of the United States.

List of representatives

Djibouti–United States relations

References 

 
United States
Djibouti